Soyuz TMA-6 was a human spaceflight to the International Space Station (ISS). It carried three crew members of Expedition 11 to the International Space Station. It was the 26th crewed flight to the ISS. It was launched by a Soyuz FG
and returned to Earth after performing operations at the ISS.

Crew

Docking with ISS
Docked to ISS: April 17, 2005, 02:20 UTC (to Pirs module)
Undocked from ISS: July 19, 2005, 10:38 UTC (from Pirs module)
Docked to ISS: July 19, 2005, 11:08 UTC (to nadir port of Zarya)
Undocked from ISS: October 10, 2005, 21:49 UTC (from nadir port of Zarya)

Mission highlights
Soyuz TMA-6 is a Soyuz TMA spacecraft which was launched on April 15, 2005 by a Soyuz-FG rocket from Baikonur Cosmodrome. During the return flight from the ISS, instruments in the descent module of the Soyuz spacecraft indicated a cabin-pressure-leak that is still under investigation. 
The Expedition 11 crew, Sergei Krikalev-Cdr Russia, John Phillips-U.S.A. replaced the Expedition 10 crew, Leroy Chiao-Cdr U.S.A. and  Salizhan Sharipov-Russia.

The astronaut Roberto Vittori brought a painting by the German-Russian artist George Pusenkoff titled Single Mona Lisa (1:1) to the space station, which shows an modified image of Leonardo da Vinci's Mona Lisa, and took video and photo shots of the work in the International Space Station. This art action, initiated by Pusenkoff, was mainly made possible by the efforts of the then Italian ambassador to Russia, Gianfranco Facco Bonetti. The combination of science and art, as da Vinci himself lived it, was used here to let his spirit work not only on earth, but also in space. The photos are documented in the book Mona Lisa Travels.

References

Crewed Soyuz missions
Spacecraft launched in 2005
Orbital space tourism missions
Spacecraft which reentered in 2005
Spacecraft launched by Soyuz-FG rockets